Cuddeback Lake is a dry lake in the Mojave Desert of San Bernardino County, California,  northeast of Edwards Air Force Base.

It is also the site of the Cuddeback Lake Air Force Gunnery Range.
Cuddeback Lake was also used for the filming of Madonna's "Frozen" music video in January 1998.  Many of the scenes in the Disney film Holes were filmed on Cuddeback Lake.

See also
 List of lakes in California

References

 

Endorheic lakes of California
Lakes of the Mojave Desert
Lakes of San Bernardino County, California
Lakes of California
Lakes of Southern California